William Surrey Hart (December 6, 1864 – June 23, 1946) was an American silent film actor, screenwriter, director and producer. He is remembered as a foremost Western star of the silent era who "imbued all of his characters with honor and integrity." During the late 1910s and early 1920s, he was one of the most consistently popular movie stars, frequently ranking high among male actors in popularity contests held by movie fan magazines.

Early life 
Hart was born in Newburgh, New York, to Nicholas Hart ( 1834–1895) and Rosanna Hart ( 1839–1909). William had two brothers, who died very young, and four sisters. His father was born in England, and his mother was born in Ireland. He was a distant cousin of the western star Neal Hart.

He began his acting career on stage in his 20s, with his 1888 debut performance as a member of a company headed by Daniel E. Bandmann. The following year he joined Lawrence Barrett's company in New York and  later spent several seasons with Mlle. Hortense Rhéa's traveling company. He toured and traveled extensively while trying to make a name for himself as an actor, and for a time directed shows at the Asheville Opera House in North Carolina, around the year 1900. He had some success as a Shakespearean actor on Broadway, working with Margaret Mather and other stars; he appeared in the original 1899 stage production of Ben-Hur. His family had moved to Asheville but, after his youngest sister Lotta died of typhoid fever in 1901, they all left together for Brooklyn until William went back on tour.

Film career

Hart went on to become one of the first great stars of the motion picture Western. Fascinated by the Old West, he acquired Billy the Kid's "six shooters" and was a friend of legendary lawmen Wyatt Earp and Bat Masterson. He entered films in 1914, and after playing supporting roles in two short films, he achieved stardom the same year as the lead in the feature The Bargain. Hart was particularly interested in making realistic Western films. His films are noted for their authentic costumes and props, as well as Hart's acting ability, honed on Shakespearean theater stages in the United States and England.

Beginning in 1915, Hart starred in his own series of two-reel Western short subjects for producer Thomas Ince, which were so popular that they were supplanted by a series of feature films. Many of Hart's early films continued to play in theaters, under new titles, for another decade. In 1915 and 1916 exhibitors voted him the biggest money making star in the United States. In 1917 Hart accepted a lucrative offer from Adolph Zukor to join Famous Players-Lasky, which merged into Paramount Pictures. In the films Hart began to ride a brown and white pinto he called Fritz. Fritz was the forerunner of later famous movie horses known by their own name, e.g., horses like Tom Mix's Tony, Roy Rogers's Trigger and Clayton Moore's Silver. In 1917, to signify "his patriotism and loyalty to Uncle Sam" it was announced to "change the name of his favorite horse from Fritz to one more truly American." He also volunteered from 1917 to 1918 with the Four Minute Men program to give short pro-war speeches across the country. Hart was now making feature films exclusively, and films like Square Deal Sanderson and The Toll Gate were popular with fans.

In 1919 Hart's  John Petticoats costar was a young actress named Winifred Westover. The film was made in New Orleans, and was a departure from Hart's usual roles, as he played a lumberman who was informed he'd inherited a shop selling ladies clothing.<ref>John Petticoats Proves Bill Hart is Versatile Star, ‘’The Gadsden Times Gadsden, Alabama, December 8, 1919, page 5</ref>

In 1921, Hollywood comic actor Roscoe Arbuckle was charged with rape and manslaughter in the death of aspiring actress Virginia Rappe. Amid the controversy, many of Arbuckle's fellow actors declined public comment on the case. However, Hart, who had never worked with Arbuckle or even met him, made a number of damaging public statements in which he presumed the actor's guilt. Arbuckle, who was eventually acquitted but saw his career ruined, later wrote a premise for a film parodying Hart as a thief, bully and wife beater, and it was bought by Buster Keaton. The following year, Keaton co-wrote, directed and starred in the 1922 comedy film The Frozen North. As a result, Hart refused to speak to Keaton for many years.

By the early 1920s, Hart's brand of gritty, rugged Westerns with drab costumes and moralistic themes gradually fell out of fashion. The public became attracted by a new kind of movie cowboy, epitomized by Tom Mix, who wore flashier costumes and was involved in more action scenes. Paramount dropped Hart, who then made one last bid for his kind of Western. He produced Tumbleweeds (1925) with his own money, arranging to release it independently through United Artists. The film turned out well, with an epic land-rush sequence, but did only fair business at the box office. Hart was angered by United Artists' failure to promote his film properly and sued the studio. The legal proceedings dragged on for years, and the courts finally ruled in Hart's favor, in 1940.

After Tumbleweeds, Hart retired to his Newhall, California, ranch home, "La Loma de los Vientos", which was designed by architect Arthur R. Kelly. In 1939 he appeared in his only sound film, a spoken prologue for a reissue of Tumbleweeds. In this segment, filmed at his ranch, the 74-year-old Hart reflected on the Old West and fondly recalled his silent movie heyday. The speech turned out to be his farewell to the screen. Most prints and video versions of Tumbleweeds circulating today include the speech.

Personal life
Hart was always close to his sister Mary, and when he moved to California she came with him. In his autobiography My Life East and West, he called Mary “my constant advisor,” and stated that she took care of his fan mail. Mary is listed as cowriter for two of his published books, Pinto Ben and Other Stories (1919), and And All Points West (1940).

When Winifred Westover, Hart's John Petticoats costar, was working in New York City Hart came to see her, and escorted her to dinner and shows. She was about to sign a five-year film contract with Lewis J. Selznick when Hart sent her a telegram, telling her not to sign anything until she'd received a letter he was mailing to her. The letter contained a marriage proposal. She telegraphed her acceptance.

On December 7, 1921, Hart married Westover in Los Angeles. She was 22-years-old, and Hart was 57. The only guests were the bride's mother, Hart's sister Mary, and his attorney. On the day of her wedding Westover signed an agreement to retire from acting.

Westover moved into the house shared by Hart and his sister, Mary. Six months into the marriage Hart told his pregnant wife to leave his home, and she went to live with her mother in Santa Monica. During the divorce hearing Westover testified that Hart's sister was the reason for the separation, and that her husband had insisted on keeping open the door that separated their bedroom from his sister's room.

The couple's son, William S. Hart, Jr., was born on September 22, 1922. On February 11, 1927, Westover was granted a divorce in Reno, Nevada.  She received $100,000, with the understanding she would not return to acting or have her photograph published. A trust fund of $100,000 was established for William S. Hart, Jr., to be used for his support and education.

Hart's son lived with his mother, and spent little time with his father, but when Hart's sister Mary died in 1943 it was reported that the "tall, erect cowboy" entered the funeral service "leaning on the arm of his son, William S. Hart, Jr."

Death
Hart died on June 23, 1946 in Newhall, California at the age of 81. He was buried in Green-Wood Cemetery in Brooklyn, New York. His Last Will and Testment stated: "I have made no provision in this will for my son for the reason that I have amply provided for him during my lifetime."

 Dedications 
For his contribution to the motion picture industry, William S. Hart has a star on the Hollywood Walk of Fame at 6363 Hollywood Blvd. In 1975, he was inducted into the Western Performers Hall of Fame at the National Cowboy & Western Heritage Museum in Oklahoma City, Oklahoma.

As part of the Natural History Museum of Los Angeles County, California, Hart's former home and 260-acre (1.1 km2) ranch in Newhall is now William S. Hart Park. The William S. Hart High School District as well as William S. Hart Senior High School, both located in the Santa Clarita Valley in the northern part of Los Angeles County, were named in his honor. A Santa Clarita baseball field complex is named in his honor.

The "Range Rider of the Yellowstone," a statue commissioned by Hart and modeled from life, stands on the Rimrocks in front of the airport at Billings, Montana. Hart donated it to the city in 1927, where it remains a memorial to his memory. .

On November 10, 1962, Hart was honored posthumously in an episode of The Roy Rogers and Dale Evans Show, a short-lived western variety program on ABC.

 Published books 

After Hart retired from film making he began writing short stories and book-length manuscripts. His published books are:
 Pinto Ben and Other Stories (written with Mary Hart), 1919, Britton Publishing Company
 The Golden West Boys, Injun and Whitey, 1920, Grosset & Dunlap
 Injun and Whitey Strike Out for Themselves, 1921, Grosset & Dunlap
 Injun and Whitey to the Rescue, 1922, Grosset & Dunlap
 Told Under a White Oak Tree (credited as by "Bill Hart's Pinto Pony"), 1922, Houghton Mifflin Co.
 A Lighter of Flames, 1923, Thomas Y. Crowell
 The Order of Chanta Sutas, 1925, unknown publisher
 My Life East and West, 1929, Houghton Mifflin Co.
 Hoofbeats, 1933, Dial Press
 Law on Horseback and Other Stories, 1935, self-published
 And All Points West (written with Mary Hart), 1940, Lacotah Press

 Selected filmography 

 His Hour of Manhood (1914, Short) - Pete Larson
 Jim Cameron's Wife (1914, Short) - Andy Stiles
 The Bargain (1914) - Jim Stokes
 Two-Gun Hicks (1914, Short) - Two-Gun Hicks
 In the Sage Brush Country (1914, Short) - Jim Brandon
 The Bad Buck of Santa Ynez (1914, extant; Library of Congress)
 The Gringo (1914, *unconfirmed)
 The Scourge of the Desert (1915, Short) - Bill Evers
 Mr. 'Silent' Haskins (1915, Short) - Lon Haskins
 The Grudge (1915, Short) - Rio Ed
 The Sheriff's Streak of Yellow (1915, Short) - Sheriff Hale
 The Roughneck (1915, Short, ?; Library of Congress) - Dave Page
 On the Night Stage (1915) - Texas
 The Taking of Luke McVane (1915, Short) - Luke McVane
 The Man from Nowhere (1915, Short) - Buck Varley - the Man from Nowhere
 '''Bad Buck' of Santa Ynez (1915, Short, extant; Library of Congress) - Bad Buck Peters
 The Darkening Trail (1915) - Yukon Ed
 The Conversion of Frosty Blake (1915, Short) - Frosty Blake
 Tools of Providence (1915, Short) - Steve Blake
 The Ruse (1915, Short, extant; Library of Congress) - 'Bat' Peters
 Cash Parrish's Pal (1915, Short) - Cash Parrish
 Knight of the Trail (1915, Short) - Jim Treen
 Pinto Ben (1915, Short) - Pinto Ben - Boss Rider
 Keno Bates, Liar (1915, Short) - Keno Bates
 The Disciple (1915) - Jim Houston
 Between Men (1915, extant; Library of Congress) - Bob White
 Grit (1915, Short)
 Hell's Hinges (1916, extant; Library of Congress) - Blaze Tracy
 The Aryan (1916, extant; Library of Congress) - Steve Denton
 The Primal Lure (1916) - Angus McConnell
 The Apostle of Vengeance (1916) - David Hudson
 The Captive God (1916) - Chiapa
 The Patriot (1916) - Bob Wiley
 The Dawn Maker (1916) - Joe Elk
 The Return of Draw Egan (1916, extant;DVD) - Draw Egan aka William Blake
 The Devil's Double (1916) - 'Bowie' Blake
 Truthful Tulliver (1917) - Truthful Tulliver
 The Gunfighter (1917) - Cliff Hudspeth
 The Desert Man (1917) - Jim Alton
 The Square Deal Man (1917) - Jack O'Diamonds
 Wolf Lowry (1917) - Tom 'Wolf' Lowery
 The Cold Deck (1917) - Jefferson 'On-the-Level' Leigh
 All Star Liberty Loan Drive Special for War Effort (1917)
 The Silent Man (1917) - 'Silent' Budd Marr
 The Narrow Trail (1917) - Ice Harding
 Wolves of the Rail (1918) - 'Buck' Andrade
 'Blue Blazes' Rawden (1918) - Blue Blazes Rawden
 The Tiger Man (1918) - Hawk Parsons
 Selfish Yates (1918) - 'Selfish' Yates
 Shark Monroe (1918) - Shark Monroe
 Riddle Gawne (1918) - Jefferson 'Riddle' Gawne
 The Border Wireless (1918) - Steve Ransom
 Branding Broadway (1918) - Robert Sands
 The Lion of the Hills (1918)
 Staking His Life (1918) - Bud Randall
 Breed of Men (1919) - Careless Carmody
 The Poppy Girl's Husband (1919) - Hairpin Harry Dutton
 The Money Corral (1919) - Lem Beason
 Square Deal Sanderson (1919) - Square Deal Sanderson
 Wagon Tracks (1919, extant; Library of Congress) - Buckskin Hamilton
 John Petticoats (1919, extant; Library of Congress) - 'Hardwood' John Haynes
 The Toll Gate (1920, extant; Library of Congress) - Black Deering
 Sand! (1920, extant, DVD) - Dan Kurrie
 The Cradle of Courage (1920) - 'Square' Kelly
 The Testing Block (1920) - 'Sierra' Bill
 O'Malley of the Mounted (1921) - Sergeant O'Malley
 The Whistle (1921, extant; Library of Congress) - Robert Evans
 Three Word Brand (1921) - Three Word Brand / Governor Marsden / Ben Trego
 White Oak (1921, extant; Library of Congress) - Oak Miller - A Gambling Man
 Travelin' On (1922, extant; Library of Congress) - J.B., The Stranger
 Hollywood (1923) - Himself
 Wild Bill Hickok (1923) - Wild Bill Hickok
 Singer Jim McKee (1924, extant; Library of Congress) - 'Singer' Jim McKee
 Hello, 'Frisco (1924, Short) - Himself
 Tumbleweeds (1925, extant; Library of Congress, others) - Don Carver
 Show People (1928, *cameo at studio luncheon) - Himself (uncredited)
 Tumbleweeds (1940/rerelease, *filmed talkie prologue to accompany 1925 silent)

William S. Hart Ranch and Museum 

When Hart died, he bequeathed his home to Los Angeles County so that it could be converted into a park and museum. His former home in Newhall, Santa Clarita, California has become a satellite of the Natural History Museum of Los Angeles County and remains free and open to the public to this day. The home is a Spanish Colonial Revival style mansion and contains many of the movie star's possessions including Native American artifacts and works by artists Charles Marion Russell, James Montgomery Flagg, and Joe de Yong. The Museum is an important part of Hart's legacy as he said before he died: "When I was making pictures, the people gave me their nickels, dimes, and quarters. When I am gone, I want them to have my home." The surrounding 265-acre William S. Hart Park includes the mansion, trails, an animal area with farm animals, bison, and a picnic area. Hart Park and Museum is located at 24151 Newhall Avenue, Santa Clarita, CA 91321. Since 2015, the park has been home to the Santa Clarita Cowboy Festival and Annual Hart of the West Powwow. The former was previously held at Melody Ranch.

References

Further reading 
 William Surrey Hart, My Life East and West, New York: Houghton Mifflin Company, 1929.
 Jeanine Basinger, Silent Stars, 1999. (chapter on William S. Hart and Tom Mix)
 Ronald L. Davis, William S. Hart: Projecting the American West, University of Oklahoma Press, 2003.

External links 

 
 
 In Loving Memory of William S. Hart
 William S. Hart Ranch and Museum
  (Photos & text)
 William S. Hart Photos and History
 Ron Schuler's Parlour Tricks: The Good Badman
 The Haunted Hart Ghost Site
 William S. Hart Union High School District, Santa Clarita Valley, California
 William S. Hart High School, Newhall, California
 Photographs of William S. Hart
 
 
 
 
 

1864 births
1946 deaths
19th-century American male actors
American male stage actors
20th-century American male actors
American male film actors
American male silent film actors
American male screenwriters
Film producers from California
Male Western (genre) film actors
Western (genre) film directors
American people of English descent
American people of Irish descent
Burials at Green-Wood Cemetery
People from Newburgh, New York
People from Aurora, Illinois
Male actors from Santa Clarita, California
Film directors from California
Film directors from New York (state)
People from Newhall, Santa Clarita, California
Screenwriters from New York (state)
Screenwriters from California
Screenwriters from Illinois
20th-century American male writers
Film directors from Illinois
Film producers from New York (state)
Film producers from Illinois
20th-century American screenwriters
Members of The Lambs Club